António Paiva Tavares nicknamed Fufuco (born 28 February 1986 in Praia, Cape Verde) is a former Cape Verdean footballer.

Ha Noi T&T

Traded to Vietnamese outfit Ha Noi T&T in 2011, Fufuco was known for his enthusiastic attitude from the first day of training, making his debut in the last 20 minutes of a game fronting Thanh Hoa. Even though he hit a hat-trick in a 6-2 beating of HAGL, the Cape Verdean generally underperformed for the club, earning a red card after complaining about having a goal disallowed versus Khanh Hoa. Seen as puerile by many in Vietnam, he spent prodigally on his Vietnamese girlfriend and did not send money home coupled with disappointing league showings which resulted in him leaving the team by 2012.

References

1986 births
Living people
Cape Verdean footballers
Cape Verde international footballers
Cape Verdean expatriate footballers
Association football forwards
Expatriate footballers in Vietnam
Expatriate footballers in Portugal
Expatriate footballers in Angola
Sportspeople from Praia
Cape Verdean expatriate sportspeople in Portugal
Expatriate footballers in the United Arab Emirates
Cape Verdean National Championships players
Santiago South Premier Division players
AD Bairro players
Boavista FC (Cape Verde) players
V.League 1 players
Hanoi FC players
U.D. Leiria players
G.D. Chaves players
Hatta Club players
C.R. Caála players
Domant FC players